Gulbarga–Hyderabad Intercity Express is an intercity train of the Indian Railways connecting  in Karnataka and  of Telangana. It is currently being operated with 11307/11308 train numbers on a daily basis.

Service

The 11307/Gulbarga–Hyderabad InterCity Express has an average speed of 48 km/hr and covers 222 km in 4 hrs 35 mins. 11308/Hyderabad–Gulbarga Intercity Express has an average speed of 44 km/hr and 222 km in 5 hrs.

Route and halts 

The important halts of the train are:

Coach composition

The train has standard ICF rakes with max speed of 110 kmph. The train consists of 13 coaches:

 1 AC III Tier Chair Car
 4 Chair Car
 6 General
 2 Second-class Luggage/parcel van

Traction

Both trains are hauled by electric locomotive either WAP-7 or WAP-4 from Gulbarga to Hyderabad and vice versa.

Notes

External links 

 11307/Gulbarga - Hyderabad Intercity Express
 11308/Hyderabad - Gulbarga Intercity Express

References 

Intercity Express (Indian Railways) trains
Rail transport in Karnataka
Rail transport in Telangana
Transport in Hyderabad, India
Railway services introduced in 2016